Jeannie Baker is an English-born Australian children's picture book author and artist, known for her collage illustrations and her concern for the natural environment. Her books have won many awards.

Biography

Baker was born in London, England on 2 November 1950. She studied graphic design at Croydon School of Art and Brighton Polytechnic, earning honours in art and design, before making her home in Australia in 1975. In the early 1980s, she lived in New York on an Australia Council Visual Arts Board residency. Her book, Home in the Sky (1984), was developed there.

Baker developed the illustrations for her first book, Grandfather, during her final year at Croydon School of Art. 

Baker uses a variety of textures in her works. "When I can, I like to use textures from the actual materials portrayed, such as bark, feathers, cracked paint, earth, knitted wool and rusty tin… so that their natural textures become an integral part of the work". Baker’s collages illustrate her picture books, but also stand individually as works of art. They are part of many public art collections and have been exhibited in galleries in London, New York and throughout Australia.

Baker is the author-artist of a number of award-winning picture books. Among them is Where The Forest Meets the Sea (about the Daintree Rainforest), a Boston Globe-Horn Honour Book, and the recipient of an International Board of Books for Young People (IBBY) Honour Award and a Friends of the Earth Award in Great Britain. Window was shortlisted for the Kate Greenaway Medal in Great Britain and both Window and Mirror won the Children’s Book Council of Australia Picture Book of the Year Award. Baker was the IBBY Australian nominee for the prestigious 2018 Hans Christian Andersen Award for Illustration.

Her work focuses on a diverse range of issues including: family, society, sustainability, the environment, car-free urban spaces, urban sprawl, land degradation, introduced pests, Australian outback and wildlife.

Baker was nominated for the Astrid Lindgren Memorial Award in 2021 and again in 2022.

Works
 Polar (1975)
 Grandfather (1977)
 Grandmother (1978)
 Millicent (1980)
 One Hungry Spider (1982)
 Home in the Sky (1984)
 Where the Forest Meets the Sea (1988) (also released in big book format)
 Window (1991) (also released in big book format)
 The Story of Rosy Dock (1995)
 The Hidden Forest (2000) (also released in big book format)
 Belonging (renamed Home in the United States) (2004) (also released in big book format)
 Mirror (2010)
 Circle (2016) (also released in big book format)
 Playing with Collage (2019)

Exhibitions
 Works are held in permanent collections of The Powerhouse Museum (Sydney), National Library of Australia (Canberra), Queensland Art Gallery (Brisbane), State Library of New South Wales, State Library of Victoria and Art Gallery Western Australia (Perth)
 Circle - A travelling exhibition has been organised by Newcastle Museum in collaboration with Baker, which will follow the migratory path of the Godwits, visiting museums and galleries across Australia and the world 
 Australian National Maritime Museum (Sydney) - 19 May – 31 July 2016
 Newcastle Museum - 6 August – 30 October 2016
 Canberra Museum & Gallery - 26 November – 19 February 2016/17
 Royal Botanic Gardens of Victoria (Melbourne) - 15 March – 14 May 2017
 Botanic Gardens of South Australia (Adelaide) - 5 June – 25 August 2017
 Tasmanian Museum and Art Gallery (Hobart) - 7 September – 26 November 2017
 Mt Coot-tha Botanic Gardens (Brisbane) - 11 December – 25 February 2017/18
 Bundaberg Art Gallery - 7 March – 6 May 2018

Film
 Where the Forest Meets the Sea (10-minute, 35mm animated film, produced by Screen Australia, directed by Baker)
 The Story of Rosy Dock (10-minute, 35mm animated film, produced by Screen Australia, directed by Baker)

Awards and nominations
 Circle
 Indie Award Best Children's Book 2017
 Riverby Award Natural History Writing for Children 2017
 Young Australians Best Book Award for Picture Books Shortlisted 2017
 Kids Own Australian Literature Award for Picture Books Shortlisted 2017
 Wilderness Society Award for Children's Picture Books Shortlisted 2017
 Australian Book Industry Book of the Year for Younger Children Shortlisted 2017

 Mirror
 Children’s Book Council of Australia Picture Book of the Year Award Joint Winner 2011
 Children’s Book Council of Australia Junior Judges Award - Picture Book of the Year Award Honour Book 2011
 Indies (Independent Booksellers Association Awards) Children’s Book of the Year Winner 2011
 NSW Premier’s Literary Awards, Patricia Wrightson Prize for Children’s Literature Shortlisted 2011
 International Youth Library White Ravens Award 2011
 Western Australian Premier’s Book Awards Children’s Book Category Shortlist 2011
 British Book Design and Production Awards, Primary, Secondary and Tertiary Education Category Winner 2011
 CJ Picture Book Awards, CJ Culture Foundation, Korea New Publications Category Finalist 2011
 International School Libraries Network Singapore Red Dot Book Awards Shortlisted 2010-11

 Belonging
 The Wilderness Society Fiction Award for Children’s Books 2005
 ALA Notable Book USA 2005
 Children’s Book Council of Australia Picture book of the Year Honour Book 2005

 The Hidden Forest
 Australian Wilderness Society Fiction Award for Children’s Books 2001
 Govern Award for Children’s Science Picture Books, USA Winner 2003

 The story of Rosy Dock
 Children’s Book Council of Australia Picture book of the Year Honour Book Award 1990
 The Australian Wilderness Society Fiction Award for Children’s books 1996
 The American Library Association Notable Book 1996
 Australian Film Industry Award for Best Australian animated Film Finalist 1995
 Gold medal for animation Palma international Film Festival 1995

 Window
 Children’s Book Council of Australia Picture Book of the Year Award 1992
 Young Australian’s Best Book Award Picture Books 1992
 Kate Greenaway medal UK Shortlisted 1992
 Notable Book in the Field of Social Science USA 1992

 Where the Forest Meets the Sea
 Australian Children’s Book Council Picture Book of the Year Honour Book 1988
 Young Australian’s Best Book Award Picture Books 1988
 Earthworm Book Award Friends of the Earth UK 1988
 Boston Globe Horn Book Magazine Honour Book Award 1990
 International Board of Books for Young people Honour Book Award 1990
 Austrian Children’s Book Council Honour Book award 1996
 Australian Film Institute award for Best Australian Animated Film 1988
 Greater Union Yoram Gross Award for Best Australian Animated Film 1988

 Home in the Sky
 The American Library Association Notable Book 1984
 Kate Greenaway Medal UK shortlisted 1985
 Children’s book Council of Australia Picture Book of the Year Award Commended 1985
 Young Australian’s Best Book Award Shortlisted 1986.

References

External links
Jeannie Baker's official website

1950 births
Living people
English children's writers
Australian children's writers
British women children's writers
20th-century British women writers
21st-century British women writers
Children's non-fiction writers
Writers from New South Wales
20th-century English women artists
20th-century Australian women artists
21st-century English women artists
21st-century Australian women artists
Collage artists
Women collage artists
Australian children's book illustrators
Australian conservationists
British expatriates in Australia
Alumni of the University of Brighton
Australian animators
Australian women animators